NFL Top 100 Players of 2021 is the eleventh season in the NFL Top 100 series. It premiered on August 15, 2021, and concluded on August 28, 2021. Kansas City Chiefs quarterback Patrick Mahomes was named the number one player.

Episode list

The list

Sources 
2021 Pro Bowl rosters:
2020 All-Pro Team:
 PFWA All-Rookie Team:

Reception

Players 
Arizona Cardinals tackle D. J. Humphries criticized the list and its voting process, disagreeing with the placement of players such as J. J. Watt and DeAndre Hopkins.

References 

National Football League trophies and awards
National Football League records and achievements
National Football League lists